Marguerita Goua Lou (born 31 May 1970) is an Ivorian judoka. She competed in the women's heavyweight event at the 1996 Summer Olympics.

References

1970 births
Living people
Ivorian female judoka
Olympic judoka of Ivory Coast
Judoka at the 1996 Summer Olympics
Place of birth missing (living people)
African Games medalists in judo
Competitors at the 1995 All-Africa Games
African Games silver medalists for Ivory Coast